Ramazan often refers to:

 Ramadan or Ramazan, the holy month in Islam during which Muslims fast for 30 days

Ramazan may also refer to:

Given name (people)

Sportsmen 
Ramazan Tavşancıoğlu (born 1984), Australian football (soccer) player
Ramazan Kurşunlu (born 1981), Turkish football (soccer) player
Ramazan Ramazanov (born 1984), Russian kickboxer
Ramazan Tunç (born 1975), Turkish football (soccer) player
Ramazan Abbasov (born 1983), Azerbaijani football (soccer) player
Ramazan Rragami (born 1944), former Albanian football (soccer) player
Ramazan Sal (born 1985), Turkish professional footballer who currently plays as a center back for Göztepe
Ramazan Magomedov, Belarusian amateur boxer who qualified for the 2008 Olympics
Ramazan Özcan (born 1984), Austrian football goalkeeper
Ramazan Çevik (born 1992), Belgian professional footballer of Turkish descent
Ramazan Kahya (born 1984), Turkish professional footballer
Ramazan Serkan Kılıç (born 1984), Turkish volleyball player
Ramazan Köse (born 1988), Turkish football player
Ramazan Şahin (born 1983), Turkish freestyle wrestler of Chechen origin
Ramazan Yıldırım (born 1975), German-born Turkish former footballer and manager

Politicians 
Ramazan-zade Yeşilce Mehmet Çelebi, Ottoman minister of finance during the reign of Suleiman
Ramazan Abdulatipov (born 1946), Russian politician of Dagestani heritage
Ramazan Bashardost (born 1965), an Afghani politician

Other people 
Ramazan Kubat (born 1974), Turkish folk singer and composer
Ramazan Yesergepov, jailed Kazakhstani journalist

Places 
Rămăzan, a village administered by Rîșcani city, Moldova

Other uses 
Ramazanids (Ramazan Beg), Turkish emirate from 1352 to 1608

Turkish masculine given names